Spixiana is a biannual peer-reviewed scientific journal published by Verlag Dr. Friedrich Pfeil on behalf of the Bavarian State Collection of Zoology, covering research in zoology. Spixiana publishes original works in the fields of taxonomy, morphology, phylogeny, and zoogeography. It also publishes monographs in supplements.

References

External links 

Biannual journals
Zoology journals
Publications established in 1977
Multilingual journals